BSC Preussen was an ice hockey team in Berlin, Germany that existed between 1983 and 2005. They played in the highest German league from 1987 to 2001, reaching the playoff semifinals on seven occasions.

History
BSC Preussen was founded in 1983 in West Berlin. by the ice hockey sections of Berliner Schlittschuhclub and BFC Preussen. The ice hockey section of Berliner SC had split from the main club in 1981 and folded just a year later. BFC Preussen had won promotion to the 2nd Bundesliga in 1983. BSC Preussen thus started out playing in the 2nd Bundesliga in 1983–84, and won promotion to the Bundesliga for the 1987–88 season.

When the Deutsche Eishockey Liga replaced the Bundesliga in 1994, BSC Preussen continued playing there. In 1995–96 they played as Preussen Devils before changing their name to Berlin Capitals for the following season. The club was relegated in 2002. Due to financial difficulties, the club immediately dropped all the way to the Regionalliga, the fourth level of German ice hockey. After just one season, BC Preussen won promotion to the Oberliga where they played the 2003–04 season. Due to renewed financial problems, the club entered a cooperation with Berliner Schlittschuhclub in 2004 and played the 2004–05 Oberliga season as BSC Preussen, before folding due to bankruptcy.

A successor club was formed already in 2004, the Eishockey-Club Charlottenburg Preussen Juniors Berlin (ECC Preussen Juniors Berlin), renamed to ECC Preussen Berlin in 2012. They won the Regionalliga multiple times, played several seasons in the Oberliga and folded after bankruptcy in 2020.

Season-by-season

References

Ice hockey teams in Germany
1983 establishments in West Germany
2005 disestablishments in Germany
Ice hockey clubs established in 1983
Ice hockey clubs disestablished in 2005
Sport in Berlin
Deutsche Eishockey Liga teams